Werner Hermann Georg Braun (19 May 1926 – 24 August 2012) was a German musicologist.

Life 
Born in Sangerhausen, Braun studied musicology at the Martin Luther University of Halle-Wittenberg from 1946 to 1950 with Max Schneider and school music with main instrument piano and Germanistics. In 1950 he passed the Staatsexamen for the teaching profession in the subjects music and German. In 1952 he received his doctorate with a dissertation on Johann Mattheson. In 1958, the University of Halle-Wittenberg accepted his habilitation on the Central German Choral Passion in the 18th century. At the end of 1961, Braun left the German Democratic Republic with his wife and children and became a Privatdozent at the Christian-Albrechts-Universität zu Kiel, combined with a research position. There he was appointed extraordinary professor in 1967. In 1968 he moved to Saarbrücken as a scientific councilor with a professorial title at the Saarland University. There he became Ordinarius for Musicology in July 1972 as successor to Walter Wiora. After the formal abolition of the chairs by the Saarland University Act in the later 1970s, Braun was given the title of "Professor for life" (salary scale C). He held this office until his emeritus appointment in autumn 1994.

Academic activity 
Braun's main areas of research were German and British music history of the 17th and 18th centuries, especially North and Central German church music, opera and Singspiel, art song and music theory of this period. His important research work includes Britannia abundans (1977), a fundamental study of Anglo-German musical relations at the time of William Shakespeare, The change of style of music around 1600 (1982), an analysis of the transition from Renaissance music to Baroque music, and Thöne und Melodeyen, Arien und Canzonetten (2004), a comprehensive treatise on the German art song in the Baroque era. Within the Neue Handbuch der Musikwissenschaft edited by Carl Dahlhaus and Hermann Danuser, Braun wrote the volume on 17th century music (1981), and in the edited collection Geschichte der Musiktheorie he is author of the volume on the historical development of German music theory from Sethus Calvisius to Johann Mattheson.

Braun wrote (until 2007) 15 monographs, about 140 scientific essays and 38 articles for the new edition of the encyclopedia Die Musik in Geschichte und Gegenwart (1994-2007). In addition, he published eight editions of sheet music by German composers of the 17th and 18th centuries. From 1987 to 1993 he was founder and director of the publication series Saarbrücker Studien zur Musikwissenschaft, Neue Folge. On his 65th and 75th birthday, one commemorative publication each was dedicated to him.

Braun was a member of the Scientific Advisory Board of the Critical Complete Edition of all works of Johann Rosenmüller.

Braun died in Saarbrücken at the age of 86.

Work 
 Die mitteldeutsche Choralpassion im 18. Jahrhundert. Evangelische Verlags-Anstalt, Berlin 1960 (at the same time: habilitation thesis Universität Halle-Wittenberg 1958)
 Das Problem der Epochengliederung in der Musik. Darmstadt 1977, 
 Britannia abundans. Deutsch-englische Musikbeziehungen zur Shakespearezeit.  Schneider, Tutzing 1977, 
 Die Musik des 17. Jahrhunderts. Laaber-Verlag, Laaber 1981,  (Neues Handbuch der Musikwissenschaft, volume 4)
 Der Stilwandel in der Musik um 1600. Wissenschaftliche Buchgesellschaft, Darmstadt 1981, 
 Samuel Michael und die Instrumentalmusik um 1630. Wissenschaftliche Buchgesellschaft, Darmstadt 1990,  
 Die Musiktheorie des 16. und 17. Jahrhunderts in Deutschland, volume 2: Deutsche Musiktheorie von Calvisius bis Mattheson. Wissenschaftliche Buchgesellschaft, Darmstadt 1994,  (Geschichte der Musiktheorie, volume 8, part 2)
 Thöne und Melodeyen, Arien und Canzonetten. Zur Musik des deutschen Barockliedes. Niemeyer, Tübingen 2004,

Editions 
 Heinrich Schütz: Unser Herr Jesus Christus in der Nacht, da er verraten ward (SW 495). Bärenreiter, Kassel 1961
 Johann Walter: Sämtliche Werke, volume 4. Bärenreiter, Kassel 1973
 Johann Gottfried Müthel: Klavierkonzerte. Katzbichler, Munich 1979 (Denkmäler norddeutscher Musik, volumes 3/4)

Further reading 
 Akademie und Musik. Festschrift für Werner Braun zum 65. Geburtstag, edited by Wolf Frobenius [...]. Saarbrücker Druckerei und Verlag, Saarbrücken 1993,  (contains Werner Braun's bibliography until 1992)
 Musik und Szene. Festschrift for Werner Braun on his 75th birthday, edited by Bernhard R. Appel [...]. Saarbrücker Druckerei und Verlag, Saarbrücken 2001,  (contains Werner Braun's bibliography 1993-2000)
 Werner Braun: Article Braun, Werner, in Die Musik in Geschichte und Gegenwart, new edition, volume 3, Bärenreiter, Kassel 2000, 
 Hans Heinrich Eggebrecht / Herbert Schneider: Artikel Braun, Werner, in The New Grove Dictionary of Music and Musicians, 2nd edition, volume 4, Macmillan, London 2002,

References

External links 
Vorstellung auf den Seiten der Fachrichtung Musikwissenschaft der Universität des Saarlandes

20th-century German musicologists
Academic staff of Saarland University
1926 births
2012 deaths
People from Sangerhausen